Zhora (Armenian: Ժորա, Russian: Жора) is a Slavic masculine given name, a short version of Yegor, Georg or Georgy. It is also used as a full masculine given name in Armenia.

Notable people with the given name include:
Zhora Harutyunyan (1928–2002), Armenian writer and playwright
Zhora Hovhannisyan (born 1987), Armenian footballer

See also
 List of Blade Runner characters#Zhora_Salome